The Kabinda worm lizard (Monopeltis kabindae) is a species of amphisbaenian in the family Amphisbaenidae. The species is native to Central Africa.

Geographic range
M. kabindae is found in the Central African Republic and the Democratic Republic of the Congo.

The type locality is Kabinda, Democratic Republic of the Congo.

Description

Reproduction
The mode of reproduction of M. kabindae is unknown.

References

Further reading
de Witte G-F, Laurent RF (1942). "Contribution à la systématique de Amphisbaenidae du Congo belge". Revue de zoologie et de botanique africaines 36 (1): 67–86. (Monopeltis kabindae, new species, p. 76). (in French).
dos Santos LC (2013). "Discovery of the second specimen of the African amphisbaenian Monopeltis kabindae Witte & Laurent, 1942". African Journal of Herpetology 62 (2): 109–116.
Gans C (2013). "Checklist and Bibliography of the Amphisbaenia of the World". Bulletin of the American Museum of Natural History (289): 1–130. (Monopeltis kabindae, p. 36).

Monopeltis
Reptiles of the Central African Republic
Reptiles of the Democratic Republic of the Congo
Reptiles described in 1942
Taxa named by Gaston-François de Witte
Taxa named by Raymond Laurent
Southern Congolian forest–savanna mosaic